Lawrence "Lipbone" Redding is an American songwriter, guitarist, singer, composer, performance artist, and voicestrumentalist. He is most noted for his ability to vocally imitate trombones, bass and percussion and incorporate them into live musical performances. The name Lipbone is a contraction of "Lip Trombone". In addition, Redding also uses throat singing, which is one of the oldest forms of music found in a variety of cultures. Redding covered Joe Tex and William Devaughn's soul song.

Career
Redding's album Hop The Fence ranked number 3 on the Jamband Radio Chart in 2007 and remained in the top 10 for 11 consecutive weeks. The song "Dogs Of Santiago," written and performed by Redding, ranked in the top 100 of the Americana Music Association radio charts for the same year. In July 2011 the album Unbroken by Lipbone Redding and The LipBone Orchestra reached No. 71 on the Americana Music Association radio chart.

The song "Hollywood An' Vine", written and performed by Redding, is on the soundtrack of A&E's television program Parking Wars.
The song "Tuscaloosa Suntan", written and performed by Redding, is on the soundtrack of MTV's television program Jersey Shore.
The songs "I Hear Voices" and "Precious things", written and performed by Redding, are on the soundtrack of FX's television program Starved.

Based in New York City since the early 1990s, Redding is the co-founder of the 67-year performance art project LoveSphere (under the pseudonym "CitiZen One"). He is also a collaborator with the Bill T. Jones/Arnie Zane Dance Company and co-composer of the production "Chapel/Chapter." The evening-length show was awarded the 2006–2007 Bessie Awards by the New York Dance & Performance Awards Committee for best collaborative effort and 2008 Toronto's Dora Mavor Moore Award for outstanding production.

Redding is attributed with diverse recordings and compositions ranging from abstract to contemporary mainstream. Most notable are his albums on his Beautiful Flying Records label: Hop The Fence (2006), Party On The Fire Escape (2007), Science Of Bootyism (2008), Unbroken (2011), The Best of LB Volume 1 (2012), Esmeralda (2014), Return of the Beautiful (2018), Runaway Snail Remastered (2018).

He currently lives in North Carolina and is touring solo, although he occasionally continues to perform with his group The LipBone Orchestra.

References

External links
 Lipbone Redding official website
 Chapel/Chapter
 Live performance with the LipBone Orchestra on KDHX St. Louis
 PBS's "OnTour" with Lipbone Redding 
 Washington the Magazine, May/June 2018

1967 births
Living people
American male singer-songwriters
American male composers
21st-century American composers
American performance artists
Performance art in New York City
Singers from New York City
21st-century American male musicians
Singer-songwriters from New York (state)